Sharon Township is one of the fifteen townships of Noble County, Ohio, United States.  The 2000 census found 353 people in the township.

Geography
Located in the southwestern part of the county, it borders the following townships:
Noble Township - northeast
Olive Township - east
Jackson Township - southeast
Center Township, Morgan County - southwest
Manchester Township, Morgan County - west
Brookfield Township - northwest

No municipalities are located in Sharon Township.

Name and history
Sharon Township derives its name from Sharon, Connecticut.  Statewide, other Sharon Townships are located in Franklin, Medina, and Richland counties.

Government
The township is governed by a three-member board of trustees, who are elected in November of odd-numbered years to a four-year term beginning on the following January 1. Two are elected in the year after the presidential election and one is elected in the year before it. There is also an elected township fiscal officer, who serves a four-year term beginning on April 1 of the year after the election, which is held in November of the year before the presidential election. Vacancies in the fiscal officership or on the board of trustees are filled by the remaining trustees.

References

External links
Noble County Chamber of Commerce 

Townships in Noble County, Ohio
Townships in Ohio